Annette Marie Lloyd ( D'Agostino; born August 8, 1962, Staten Island, New York) is a silent film historian and author of numerous books on silent film and television, particularly on the life and works of actor Harold Lloyd.

Between 2000-05 she was a celebrity biographer and production coordinator  at Hollywood Forever Cemetery. She was formerly an adjunct professor of speech communication at Hofstra University and an adjunct professor of communication at William Paterson College.

Personal life
D'Agostino Lloyd was married in 1999 to Scott Lloyd, but neither she nor her husband are related to actor Harold Lloyd. She has one son, Matthew, born in 2004. She currently resides in Rumford, Rhode Island.

Selected works
The Lloyd Herald. (Harold Lloyd fan club magazine) (as Annette D'Agostino); self-published, 1995-99.
Harold Lloyd: A Bio-Bibliography (as Annette M. D'Agostino), Greenwood Press 1994; .
An Index to Short and Feature Film Reviews in the Moving Picture World: The Early Years, 1907 - 1915 (as Annette M. D'Agostino), Greenwood Press 1995; .
Filmmakers in The Moving Picture World: An Index of Articles, 1907-1927 (as Annette M. D'Agostino), McFarland 1997; .
From Soap Stars to Superstars: Celebrities Who Started Out in Daytime Drama. (as Annette D'Agostino), Renaissance Books 1999; .
Hollywood Forever Cemetery: The Official Directory. A Visit with 135 Stars and Founders of Historic Hollywood. (as "Celebrity Biographer: Annette Lloyd, Production Coordinator"), Hollywood Forever Cemetery, 2003.
The Harold Lloyd Encyclopedia. (as Annette D'Agostino Lloyd), McFarland 2004; .
Harold Lloyd's Rogues' Gallery (as Annette D'Agostino Lloyd; private publication), 2005.
Harold Lloyd: Magic in a Pair of Horn-Rimmed Glasses. (as Annette D'Agostino Lloyd), BearManor Media 2009; .

Contributing writer/researcher
"Harold Lloyd: A Look at the Legend", The Silent Film Newsletter, Vol. II, No.5, 1994.
"Harold Lloyd: A Comic Genius Learns Comedy", Classic Images magazine, 1995.
"Harold Lloyd's Leading Ladies: A Comparative Examination", The Silent Film Monthly, Vol. III, No.6, 1995
"Silent Film Comedy as Redefined by Harold Lloyd", Films of the Golden Age (magazine), Winter 1997-98.
Catalog for Screen Snapshots (film series) for Academy of Motion Picture Arts and Sciences, 1998.
Behind the Planet of the Apes, research, Van Ness Films (video documentary), 1998.
Lost in Space Forever, research, Van Ness Films (video documentary), 1998.
"Silent Cinema's Most Normal Guy", from The Hollywood Archive: The Hidden History of Hollywood in the Golden Age, Angel City Press, 2000.
Silent Film Necrology, 2nd Edition by Eugene Michael Vazzana. (Foreword by Annette D'Agostino Lloyd), McFarland 2001, 0-7864-1059-0.
Liner Notes from The Harold Lloyd Collection, Vol. 1 (Slapstick Symposium) (as Virginia Lyon), Kino International, 2004.
Behind the Silver Screen: Stories from Residents of the Motion Picture & Television Fund Retirement Community (as Contributing Writer), Variety Custom Publishing, 2005.
"The Thrill of It All: The Man Who Dared", Variety, Custom Publishing, Commemorative Issue on Harold Lloyd, 2005.
"All-American Boy Makes Good: The Life of Harold Lloyd", Variety Custom Publishing, Commemorative Issue on Harold Lloyd, 2005.
"Sheen on Dean", Variety Custom Publishing, Commemorative Issue on James Dean, 2005.
A Review of "Flickers of Desire: Movie Stars of the 1910s", Quarterly Review of Film and Video, 30:3, 235-40 ( [Print], 1543-5326 [Online]), 2013
"The Moving Picture World: Where Everything Old Is New Again", The Silent Film Quarterly, Fall 2015.
Bebe Daniels: Hollywood’s Good Little Bad Girl by Charles Epting. (Foreword by Annette D'Agostino Lloyd), McFarland 2016, 978-1-4766-6374-6.

Documentary appearances
The Welsh in Hollywood. Alfresco TV for ITV (UK), 1999.
R.I.P.: Great Cemeteries of the World – Hollywood Forever. Minds Eye Entertainment for The Travel Channel, 2002.
From Soap to Stardom.  E! Entertainment TV, 2003.
Hollywood: Ghosts and Gravesites. Delta Entertainment for The Discovery Channel, 2003
They Started on Soaps,  I, II and III. SOAPNet, 2003.
Douglas Fairbanks: The Great Swashbuckler. Delta Entertainment (DVD), 2005.
Rudolph Valentino: The Great Lover. Delta Entertainment (DVD), 2005.
The Harold Lloyd Comedy Collection. Audio commentary and supplemental material, New Line Home Entertainment, (DVD), 2005; .
The Lot of Fun: Where the Movies Learned to Laugh
Harold Lloyd: Hollywood's Timeless Comedy Genius

References

External links
 Annette Lloyd's original HaroldLloyd.com content, with updates
 
 24Caret Editorial Consulting, Annette Lloyd's Full Bibliography via web.archive.org
 Harold Lloyd's LA Locations: Annette Lloyd gives a tour of film locations in downtown Los Angeles via YouTube.com
 Annette D'Agostino Lloyd at KSFF 2011 (speaking at the Kansas Silent Film Festival, 2011)

1962 births
Living people
American film historians
Celebrity biographers
People from Staten Island
St. John's University (New York City) alumni
Hofstra University faculty
William Paterson University faculty
American women historians
Historians from New York (state)
21st-century American women